Kalinov is a village and municipality in the Medzilaborce District in the Prešov Region of far north-eastern Slovakia.

History
In historical records the village was first mentioned in 1596 and 1604.

In the autumn of 1944, Kalinov was the first municipality in former Czechoslovakia liberated by the Allies.

Geography
The municipality lies at an altitude of 453 metres and covers an area of 13.784 km². It has a population of about 300 people.

Genealogical resources

The records for genealogical research are available at the state archive "Statny Archiv in Presov, Slovakia"

 Roman Catholic church records (births/marriages/deaths): 1786-1898 (parish B)
 Greek Catholic church records (births/marriages/deaths): 1794-1895 (parish B)

Gallery

See also
 List of municipalities and towns in Slovakia

References

External links
 
 
https://web.archive.org/web/20070513023228/http://www.statistics.sk/mosmis/eng/run.html
Surnames of living people in Kalinov

Villages and municipalities in Medzilaborce District
Zemplín (region)